Oksanen is a Finnish surname. Notable people with the surname include:

 Arto Oksanen (21st century), Finnish amateur astronomer
 Eino Oksanen (born 1931), Finnish marathon runner
 Kaarlo Oksanen (1909–1941), Finnish footballer
 Sofi Oksanen (born 1977), Estonian-Finnish novelist and playwright
 Ville Oksanen (born 1987), Finnish footballer
 Lasse Oksanen (born 1942), Finnish ice hockey player

Finnish-language surnames